Yury Selikhov (born 19 May 1986) is a Russian bobsledder. He competed in the two-man event at the 2018 Winter Olympics.

References

1986 births
Living people
Russian male bobsledders
Olympic bobsledders of Russia
Bobsledders at the 2018 Winter Olympics
Place of birth missing (living people)